Ternstroemia bullata is a species of tree in the family Pentaphylacaceae. It is endemic to Jamaica. It is a critically endangered species with only two remaining individuals known, both in Clarendon Parish.

References

bullata
Endemic flora of Jamaica
Critically endangered plants
Taxonomy articles created by Polbot